Thiacidas leonie  is a moth of the family Noctuidae. It is found in Ethiopia and Tanzania.

References
Hacker, H. H. & Zilli, A. 2007. Revisional notes on the genus Thiacides Walker, 1855, with descriptions of Thiacidinae subfam. nov. and eleven species (Lepidoptera: Noctuidae). - Esperiana Memoir 3:179–246, pls. 21–30.

External links
 boldsystem.org: Images of Thiacidas leonie

Thiacidas
Insects of Ethiopia
Insects of Tanzania
Moths of Africa
Moths described in 2007